"Girls" is a song recorded by South Korean girl group Aespa for their second extended play of the same name. It was released as the EP's lead single on July 8, 2022, by SM Entertainment.

Background and release
On June 27, 2022, SM Entertainment announced Aespa would be releasing their second extended play titled Girls on July 8. On July 7, the music video teaser was released. The remix versions by Brllnt and Minit were released on October 21.

Composition
"Girls" was written by Yoo Young-jin, composed by Ryan S. Jhun, Hanif Hitmanic Sabzevari, Dennis DeKo Kordnejad, Rodnae "Chikk" Bell, Pontus PJ Ljung, and Yoo Young-jin, and arranged by Ryan S. Jhun, Hanif Hitmanic Sabzevari, Dennis DeKo Kordnejad, Pontus PJ Ljung, and Yoo Young-jin. Musically, the song was described as a "dark", "brooding" dance, pop and electropop song with "heavy bass synth" and lyrics about "Aespa and ae-Aespa having a full-fledged battle with Black Mamba [the antagonist]". The song's "glitchy, electronic-heavy production" softens during the bridge, before "sliding into a nutty techno breakdown" at the end.

Commercial performance
"Girls" debuted at number 72 on South Korea's Circle Digital Chart in the chart issue dated July 3–9, 2022; on its component charts, the song debuted at number 16 on the Circle Download Chart, number 98 on the Circle Streaming Chart, and number 74 on the Circle BGM Chart. It ascended to number eight on the Circle Digital Chart in the chart issue dated July 31 – August 6, 2022; on its component charts, the song ascended to number eight on the Circle Download Chart, number 11 on the Circle Streaming Chart, and number 57 on the Circle BGM Chart in the chart issue dated July 10–16, 2022. On the Billboard South Korea Songs, the song debuted at number one in the chart issue dated July 3, 2022.

In Japan, "Girls" debuted at number 94 on the Billboard Japan Hot 100 in the chart issue dated July 13, 2022, ascending to number 30 in the following week. On its component charts, it debuted at number 79 on the Top Download Songs in the chart issue dated July 13, 2022, and number 39 on the Top Streaming Songs in the chart issue dated July 20, 2022. On the Oricon Combined Singles, the song debuted at number 35 in the chart issue dated July 25, 2022. In New Zealand, the song debuted at number 23 on the RMNZ Hot Singles in the chart issue dated July 18, 2022. In Australia, the song debuted at number 18 on the ARIA Top 20 Hitseekers Singles Chart in the chart issue dated July 18, 2022.

In Singapore, "Girls" debuted at number 13 on the RIAS Top Streaming Chart, and number five on the RIAS Top Regional Chart in the chart issue dated July 8–14, 2022. It also debuted at number 14 on the Billboard Singapore Songs in the chart issue dated July 23, 2022. In Malaysia, the song debuted at number 11 on the Billboard Malaysia Songs in the chart issue dated July 23, 2022. In Indonesia, the song debuted at number 13 on the Billboard Indonesia Songs in the chart issue dated July 23, 2022. In Hong Kong, the song debuted at number 15 on the Billboard Hong Kong Songs in the chart issue dated July 23, 2022. In Taiwan, the song debuted at number eight on the Billboard Taiwan Songs in the chart issue dated July 23, 2022. In Vietnam, the song debuted at number eight on the Billboard Vietnam Hot 100 in the chart issue dated July 21, 2022.

In the United States, "Girls" debuted at number six on the Billboard World Digital Song Sales in the chart issue dated July 23, 2022. Globally, the song debuted at number 42 on the Billboard Global 200, and number 25 on the Billboard Global Excl. U.S in the chart issue dated July 23, 2022.

Promotion
Following the release of Girls, Aespa performed "Girls" alongside "Black Mamba" on Good Morning Americas Summer Concert series on July 8. The group held a live event called "Aespa Girls Comeback Live" on July 11 on YouTube and TikTok to introduce the extended play and its songs, including "Girls", and to communicate with their fans. They subsequently performed on two music programs in the first week of promotion in South Korea: Mnet's M Countdown on July 14, and MBC's Show! Music Core on July 16. On the second week, they performed on KBS's Music Bank on July 22.

Track listing
 Digital download / streaming (iScreaM Vol.18: Girls Remixes)
 "Girls" (Brllnt remix) – 2:55
 "Girls" (Minit remix) – 3:42
 "Girls" – 4:00 (not included on Korean streaming services)

Credits and personnel
Credits adapted from the liner notes of Girls.

Studio
 SM Booming System – recording, digital editing, engineered for mix, mixing
 Sonic Korea – mastering

Personnel
 Aespa – vocals, background vocals
 Yoo Young-jin – lyrics, composition, arrangement, vocal directing, background vocals, recording, digital editing, engineered for mix, mixing, music and sound supervisor 
 Ryan Jhun – composition, arrangement
 Hanif "Hitmanic" Sabzevari – composition, arrangement
 Dennis "DeKo" Kordnejad – composition, arrangement
 Rodnae "Chikk" Bell – composition
 Pontus "PJ" Ljung – composition, arrangement
 Jeon Hoon – mastering
 Shin Soo-min – mastering assistant

Charts

Weekly charts

Monthly charts

Year-end chart

Accolades

Release history

See also
 List of M Countdown Chart winners (2022)
 List of Show Champion Chart winners (2022)

References

2022 singles
2022 songs
Korean-language songs
Aespa songs
SM Entertainment singles
Warner Records singles
Songs written by Yoo Young-jin